Golden eye-grass is a common name for several plants and may refer to:
 Curculigo orchioides, a flowering plant species
 Sisyrinchium californicum, a flowering plant species

References